The LeeVees are a rock band from New York City featuring Adam Gardner of Guster and Dave Schneider of the Zambonis. The band was formed when the two bands went on tour together. The latter band only writes songs about ice hockey. Gardner and Schneider thought it would be fun to form another rock band, a Jewish one, that only wrote songs about Hanukkah, because there was a dearth of contemporary songs about that holiday. It first came to prominence near the end of 2005 with its debut album, Hanukkah Rocks. After realizing its initial approach was rather narrow, it continues as a band with a strong Jewish identity. Hanukkah Rocks producer Peter Katis had previously worked with Guster, as well as a range of indie-rock acts.

Members
Adam LeeVee (Adam Gardner) – vocals, guitar
David LeeVee (Dave Schneider) – vocals, guitar
Michael LeeVee (Michael Azerrad) – drums
Shawn LeeVee (Shawn Fogel) – bass
Shank Bone Mystic (Daniel Saks)  – keyboards, banjo

Discography
Hanukkah Rocks (Reprise/Warner Bros. Records, 2005)

References

External links
The LeeVees' official website

Jewish American musicians
Musical groups from New York City
Jewish rock groups